Luciano Dalla Bona (born 8 November 1943) is a retired Italian road cyclist. Competing as amateur in the 100 km team time trial, he won an Olympics silver medal in 1964 and two world titles, in 1964 and 1965, finishing third in 1966. After that he turned professional and won one stage of the Tour of Italy in 1968. He rode the Tour de France in 1967 and 1970. His younger brother Giovanni Dalla Bona was also a professional road cyclist.

References

1943 births
Living people
Italian male cyclists
Olympic silver medalists for Italy
Cyclists at the 1964 Summer Olympics
Olympic cyclists of Italy
Olympic medalists in cycling
Cyclists from the Province of Verona
Medalists at the 1964 Summer Olympics
UCI Road World Champions (elite men)